Kuburajo Inscription, also called Kuburajo I Inscription, is one of the many inscriptions left by King Adityawarman of central Sumatra. The inscription was found in Kuburajo village, Lima Kaum district, Tanah Datar Regency, West Sumatra, Indonesia in 1877 besides the main road from Batusangkar city to Padang city. The inscription was registered by N.J. Krom in Inventaris der Oudheden in de Padangsche Bovenlanden ('Inventory of Antiquities in the Padang Highlands', OV 1912: 41). The inscription is written in Sanskrit, and consists of 16 lines. This inscription was lost in 1987, but was rediscovered.

When first publishing about the inscription in 1913, H. Kern initially thought that it was a memorial tombstone (Dutch: grafsteen) of King Adityawarman; based on the name of the discovery village Kuburajo (kubur = tomb, and rajo = king). F.D.K. Bosch refined this interpretation in Verslag van een reis door Sumatra ('Report of a trip through Sumatra', OV 1930: 133-57), based on Minangkabau language, to the "king's fort" (kubu = fort).

Content 
The inscription begins with referring to Adwayawarman as King Adityawarman's father. The king's title as Kanakamedinindra ('Gold Land Lord') was mentioned; and he was likened to Kalpataru, a wish-fulfilling divine tree. Adityawarman was also stated as descended from the Kulisadhara dynasty, and was seen as a manifestation of Lokeshvara and Mai.. (possibly Maitreya).

Text 
The inscription text according to Kern's transcription, as follows:

 Om mamla viragara
 Advayavarmma
 mputra Kanaka
 medinīndra
 sukrta a vila
 bdhakusalaprasa
 ǁdhruǁ maitri karu
 na a mudita u
 peksa a ǁ yacakka
 janakalpatarurupa
 mmadana ǁaǁ Adi
 tyavarmma mbhupa kulisa
 dharavansa ǀoǀ pra
 tiksa avatara
 srilokesvara
 deva ǁ mai

See also 
 Adwayawarman
 Pagaruyung Kingdom

References 

Inscriptions in Indonesia
History of West Sumatra
Sanskrit inscriptions in Indonesia